Caroline Fraser Manice (June 10, 1871 – January 11, 1929) was an American golfer.

Early life 
Caroline Fraser was born in New York City, the daughter of William Andrew Fraser and Lena Appleton Fraser.

Career 

Manice, a member of the Baltusrol Golf Club, was considered one of the top ten women golfers in the United States in 1901, with a strong long game and an orthodox full swing. She won the driving competition at Ardsley in 1898. She played several years at the U.S. Women's Amateur; in 1899 she was disqualified for taking advice from a caddie; in 1900 she was described as a "dark horse". In 1901, she lost in the semi-finals to the eventual champion, Genevieve Hecker. She lost at the Nationals again in 1902. She won the Women's Metropolitan Golf Association Championship at the Apawamis Club for three straight years, from 1902 to 1904. In 1902 she also won a championship in Florida. In 1904 she was president of the Women's Metropolitan Golf Association.

Manice was also an amateur but proficient swimmer, sailor, and tennis player. "'Sportswoman' is a term that does not appeal to me," she told a newspaper in 1904, "but it seems inevitable in these days, to describe the women to find health and rational enjoyment in open-air games." In 1905 Manice experienced health problems described as "extreme nervousness", which were attributed to her golfing. She sailed to Europe for rest and recovery, and announced that she would never play golf again. However, she played again the following year, and in inter-city competition in 1909.

Personal life 
Caroline Fraser married stockbroker Edward Augustus Manice in 1891. They had a daughter, Dorothy Jean, born in 1892. In 1905, Caroline Manice was injured in a fatal automobile accident in Flushing, New York.

Edward Manice died in 1925. Caroline Fraser Manice died in 1929, aged 57 years. In 1937, her daughter, Dorothy J. Manice, founded the Titleholders Championship, one of the early tournaments for women professional golfers in the United States.

References 

American female golfers
Amateur golfers
Golfers from New York (state)
Sportspeople from New York City
1871 births
1929 deaths